Gary Thomas Baldinger (born October 4, 1963) is a former professional American football player. Baldinger, a defensive lineman, played six seasons in the National Football League, mainly for the Kansas City Chiefs. His older brother Rich Baldinger was his teammate with the Chiefs and also played at Wake Forest. His oldest brother Brian Baldinger also played in the NFL and currently is a broadcaster.

Like his brothers, he graduated from Massapequa High School.

His son, Brad Baldinger is a two-sport athlete in baseball and football, better known as a catcher for Denison University.

References

External links
NFL.com player page

1963 births
Living people
American football defensive ends
Players of American football from Philadelphia
Kansas City Chiefs players
Indianapolis Colts players
Buffalo Bills players
Wake Forest Demon Deacons football players
Massapequa High School alumni